SS Daram was a Design 1001 wooden cargo ship that ran aground on Long Bar Reef, Bermuda, while she was travelling from Pensacola, Florida, United States, to Marseille, France.

Construction 
Daram was constructed in 1918.

She had a Triple expansion steam engine driving a single screw propeller which could hit a speed of 10 knots.

Sinking 
On 9 October 1919, Daram was on a voyage from Pensacola, Florida, United States, to Marseille, France, when she ran aground on Long Bar Reef, Bermuda. There were no casualties.

References

Cargo ships of the United States
1918 ships
Ships sunk with no fatalities
Ships built in the United States
Maritime incidents in 1919
Shipwrecks of Bermuda